Legal impossibility is a traditional common law defense to a charge of an attempted crime. Legal impossibility arises when the act, if completed, would not be a crime. A person believes she is committing a crime, but the act is, in fact, lawful. For example, a person may believe she is receiving stolen goods, but the goods are in fact not stolen.

A different form of legal impossibility (known as "hybrid legal impossibility") comes into play when an actor's goal is illegal, but commission of the crime is impossible due to a factual mistake regarding the legal status of one of the attendant circumstances of one of the elements of the crime. For example, a man attempting to bribe someone whom he mistakenly believes is a juror is not liable for attempted bribery of a juror. On the other hand, some jurisdictions may find the actor guilty of attempt. The United States Model Penal Code did away with the legal impossibility defense. So, a defendant is guilty of the attempted crime if the facts being as they believed them to be would have constituted a crime.

Footnotes

Common law
Law-related articles lacking sources
Crime